The Rosalia longicorn (Rosalia alpina) or Alpine longhorn beetle, is a large longicorn (family Cerambycidae) that is distinguished by its distinctive markings.

Description

The antennae can be up to twice as long as the rest of the body in males, and the same length in females. The elytra are flat, blue-gray, with variable black spots, including a prominent one on the thorax, a silky one in front, and a small one in back. Both the antennae and the legs have the same coloration as the body. The coloration serves as good camouflage with their preferred habitat, the European Beech.

They are distributed from Cantabrian Mountains east to Caucasus. Its numbers across Europe has greatly depleted in recent years, and it is a protected species in Germany, Hungary, Poland and Slovenia.

The adults are active from June to September. By day the beetles sit near flowers and feed on the pollen. They make a chirping sound by scraping their rear legs and elytra together. After mating, the female lays the eggs within a crack in the bark of beech trees. The larvae eat the bark and pupate there as well when it has reached about three years of age. The mature adult emerges from the pupa and then have a further lifespan of three to six weeks.

Rosalia longicorn is the logo of Danube-Ipoly National Park in Hungary.

References

External links
 
 
 ARKive page, with a number of photos
 LIFE Rosalia: Rosalia Alpina

Compsocerini
Beetles of Europe
Beetles described in 1758
Taxa named by Carl Linnaeus